The Battle of Crater or Operation Stirling Castle was an encounter during the Aden Emergency. Following the ambush of British troops by the Arab Armed Police the Crater district in Aden was abandoned by British troops. The British decided to enter Crater and retrieve the bodies of British soldiers.

The battle
The operation began on 3 July 1967 with the Argyll and Sutherland Highlanders under Lt-Col Colin Mitchell ("Mad Mitch") conducting a night invasion of Crater, which he called Operation Stirling Castle, after the Argylls’ regimental headquarters. The enemy was taken totally by surprise, and effective resistance ceased. A particular sign of Mitchell’s confidence was his decision to order the pipe band to march down the main street of Crater, playing regimental tunes, for which the Pipe major was mentioned in despatches. British troops remained in Crater until the end of the Emergency.

References

External links
Operation Stirling Castle at Britains Small Wars
The Aden Emergency at Remembering Scotland at War

the Crater (Aden)
the Crater (Aden)
Aden Emergency
July 1967 events in Asia
1967 in the Federation of South Arabia